Ramdien Sardjoe (born 10 October 1935) is a Surinamese politician and served as Vice President of Suriname from 2005 to 2010. He is a member of the Progressive Reform Party (VHP).

He was born in the District of Suriname. 

Before vice presidency, Sardjoe was the Chairman of the National Assembly from 2001 to 2005.

In 2011, Sardjoe retired from politics, and Chan Santokhi was elected new Chairman of the VHP.

Award

References

External links

Official website (in Dutch)

He was succeeded as vice president by Robert Ameerali and was vice president under half of Robert Venetiaan's rule.

 

 

1935 births
Vice presidents of Suriname
Speakers of the National Assembly (Suriname)
Living people
Surinamese Hindus
Surinamese politicians of Indian descent
Surinamese people of Indian descent
Progressive Reform Party (Suriname) politicians
Recipients of Pravasi Bharatiya Samman